Value or values may refer to:

Ethics and social 
 Value (ethics) wherein said concept may be construed as treating actions themselves as abstract objects, associating value to them
 Values (Western philosophy) expands the notion of value beyond that of ethics, but limited to Western sources 
 Social imaginary is the set of values, institutions, laws, and symbols common to a particular social group

Economics 
 Value (economics), a measure of the benefit that may be gained from goods or service
 Theory of value (economics), the study of the concept of economic value
 Value (marketing), the difference between a customer's evaluation of benefits and costs
 Value investing, an investment paradigm
 Values (heritage), the measure by which the cultural significance of heritage items is assessed
 Present value
 Present value of benefits

Business 
 Business value
 Customer value proposition
 Employee value proposition
 Value (marketing)
 Value proposition

Other uses 
 Value, also known as lightness or tone, a representation of variation in the perception of a color or color space's brightness
 Value (computer science), an expression that implies no further mathematical processing; a "normal form"
 Value (mathematics), a property such as number assigned to or calculated for a variable, constant or expression
 Value (semiotics), the significance, purpose and/or meaning of a symbol as determined or affected by other symbols
 Note value, the relative duration of a musical note
 Values (political party), a defunct New Zealand environmentalist political party

See also 
 Instrumental and intrinsic value
 Value theory, a range of approaches to understanding how, why, and to what degree people value things